Richard James McCabe (February 21, 1896 – April 11, 1950) was a pitcher in Major League Baseball who played for the Boston Red Sox (1918) and Chicago White Sox (1922). McCabe batted and threw right-handed. He was born in Mamaroneck, New York.

In a two-season-career, McCabe posted a 1-1 record with a 3.46 ERA in six appearances, including one start, four strikeouts, two walks, 17 hits allowed, and 13.0 innings of work.

McCabe died in Buffalo, New York at age 54.

External links

Retrosheet

1896 births
1950 deaths
Boston Red Sox players
Chicago White Sox players
Major League Baseball pitchers
Baseball players from New York (state)
Minor league baseball managers
Bridgeport Crossmen players
Lewiston Cupids players
Lynn Pirates players
Lynn Pipers players
Buffalo Bisons (minor league) players
Jersey City Skeeters players
Binghamton Bingoes players
Newark Bears (IL) players
Salt Lake City Bees players
Hollywood Stars players
Fort Worth Panthers players
Dallas Steers players
Fort Worth Cats players
Montreal Royals players
Birmingham Barons players